Edward Ruggles Landon (May 31, 1813 – July 25, 1883) was a Connecticut politician.

Landon was born in Guilford, Conn., May 31, 1813, the eldest son of Nathaniel Ruggles and Mary (Griswold) Landon.

He graduated from Yale College in 1833.  On leaving College he studied law in New Haven, and later in Detroit, and began practice in Tecumseh, Mich. He married in Guilford, January 1, 1838, Anna Theodora Lay, who died September 18, in the same year, with her infant child, in Tecumseh.  In December 1838, he returned to Guilford, where the rest of his life was spent in the practice of his profession. He was chosen town clerk in 1848, and judge of probate in 1854, and held both positions by continued re-election until the year of his death.  In 1856 he was a member of the Connecticut State Senate, and in 1870 of the Connecticut House of Representatives. He was long the principal magistrate in the town.  He died in Guilford, after a long illness, of gastric fever and disease of the nervous system, on July 25, 1883, in his 71st year of his age.

He married, October 5, 1871, Parnel C. Hotchkiss, of Guilford, who survived him without children.

External links

 Edward Ruggles Landon papers, 1830-1851, Yale University

1813 births
1883 deaths
People from Guilford, Connecticut
Yale College alumni
Connecticut state senators
Members of the Connecticut House of Representatives
Connecticut local politicians
Connecticut state court judges
People from Tecumseh, Michigan
19th-century American politicians
19th-century American judges